Winfried Herz (born 11 May 1929) is a retired German football player. He started his career with BSG KWU Erfurt (later renamed into Turbine and finally Rot-Weiß Erfurt) in East Germany, at the time one of the best sides in the country. In 1951 Herz fled into West Germany for political reasons, where he joined Eintracht Braunschweig. Herz went on to play 10 seasons for Eintracht Braunschweig, until he retired in 1961.

Herz also represented East Germany several times during the early 1950s. However, since those games were played before the East German Football Association became a FIFA member in 1952, they are not considered official internationals.

Honours

Club
DDR-Oberliga runner-up: 1950-51
Soviet Zone championship runner-up: 1948-49
FDGB-Pokal runner-up: 1949-50

References

1929 births
Living people
Sportspeople from Erfurt
German footballers
Eintracht Braunschweig players
FC Rot-Weiß Erfurt players
East German footballers
DDR-Oberliga players
Association football forwards
Footballers from Thuringia